A Great Big World is an American musical duo from New York made up of singer/songwriters Ian Axel and Chad King and signed to Epic Records. The group is best known for their single "This Is the New Year", which was performed by the cast in an episode of Glee and reached the Billboard Mainstream Top 40 chart in May 2013, and their worldwide hit "Say Something", particularly after recording it as a duet collaboration with Christina Aguilera. The duet peaked at number four on the Billboard Hot 100.

Career

Early beginnings
Ian Axel and Chad King met at New York University, where they were attending the Steinhardt Music Program. Both were music business students and Axel is said to have convinced King to write a song together. King agreed to work with Axel after hearing him sing. They both wrote and performed songs together prior to Axel embarking on a solo career in which he released an independent album featuring songs that were all co-written by King.

2011–2013: Breakthrough and Glee
In 2011, their song "This Is the New Year" was licensed to various television networks and was used as the theme song for MTV's I Used to Be Fat as well as being featured on The Amazing Race, ESPN, One Tree Hill, and Good Morning America. Ian Axel and Chad King went on national tour and performed as the openers for Ingrid Michaelson, Matthew Morrison (Glee), and Five for Fighting.

The duo re-branded itself in 2012, when they took the official name A Great Big World. They released a six-song EP after obtaining funding from the crowdsource funding website Kickstarter.

In 2013, "This Is the New Year" was performed by the cast in an episode of Glee.

2013–2014: Is There Anybody Out There?

In 2013, the group signed with Epic Records and released a three-song EP under the Epic label in May 2013. They completed a headline tour in conjunction with their EP release.

In June 2013, they were picked as Elvis Duran's Artist of the Month and were featured on NBC's Today where they performed live their song "This Is the New Year". The song "Say Something" was featured in the final episode of the US dance competition So You Think You Can Dance on September 3, 2013, and released digitally the same day. It climbed to number 20 on iTunes in the United States the next day. The song was subsequently re-recorded featuring Christina Aguilera after she heard the song, and this version was released on November 4, 2013, and that version reached number 1 on the iTunes charts. The following evening, A Great Big World and Aguilera gave the premiere live TV performance of the song on the NBC television series The Voice. The song reached No. 1 on the digital song chart the next day with 189,000 copies sold for the week. The video was released on November 19, 2013. In November 2013, it was announced that A Great Big World would be performing at the annual Victoria's Secret Fashion Show. The same month, they performed for the first time at the American Music Awards with Aguilera.

Their debut album, Is There Anybody Out There?, was released on January 21, 2014.

The group made an appearance on the song "Over You" on Ingrid Michaelson's 2014 album, Lights Out.

"Say Something" was also used in the nineteenth season of South Park (Episode 6) Titled "Tweek x Craig"

2015: When the Morning Comes
On April 21, 2015, it was announced through the A Great Big World Facebook page that Ian and Chad were working on a second album. The group announced the release of their first single off of the new album via Instagram in mid-July. The single "Hold Each Other" was released on July 22, 2015, featuring the rapper Futuristic. The non-rap version was released on July 24, 2015. The album was released on November 13, 2015, with the title When the Morning Comes. While visiting the UK in June 2015 they recorded at Sarm Studios in London. Several musicians and producers collaborated on the album including Dave Eggar, Derek Fuhrmann, Gregg Wattenberg, Greg Holden, Kevin Kadish, Josh Kear, Dan Romer and Mozella.

They have been writing a musical for several years. The show is about family and is called Strokes of Genius.

Discography

Studio albums

Singles

Music videos

Awards and nominations

See also
 List of Epic Records artists

References

External links 

 Official website
 Official music videos  on Vevo

Epic Records artists
American pop music duos
Male musical duos
Musical groups from New York City
Musical groups established in 2011
Grammy Award winners
2011 establishments in New York City